Dorcadion grustani is a species of beetle in the family Cerambycidae. It was described by Gonzales in 1992. It is known from Spain.

See also 
Dorcadion

References

grustani
Beetles described in 1992